Kheireddine Anouar Kherris (born 8 May 1973 in Tlemcen) is an Algerian former footballer.

He has been assistant manager and manager of WA Tlemcen.

International career

International goals
Scores and results list Algeria's goal tally first.

References

1973 births
Living people
Algerian footballers
Algeria international footballers
1998 African Cup of Nations players
WA Tlemcen players
Algerian Ligue Professionnelle 1 players
Association football defenders
Algerian football managers
WA Tlemcen managers
Algerian Ligue Professionnelle 1 managers
21st-century Algerian people